State Trunk Highway 82 (often called Highway 82, STH-82 or WIS 82) is a state highway in Wisconsin, United States. It runs east–west in southwest and south central Wisconsin from the Iowa border near Lansing, IA to Oxford.

This highway is a low traffic highway for its entire length.

Route description 
Highway 82 begins on the Wisconsin side of the Mississippi River near Lansing, Iowa.  Its next junction with a highway is across the bridge at Wisconsin Highway 35.  The highway then turns to the North, forming a short concurrency with State Highway 35.  At De Soto, Wisconsin, the route turns away from the Mississippi River Basin, and heads Northeasterly in general.  

The next settlement is Viroqua, where it forms a wrong-way concurrency with US Highway 14, US Highway 61, State Highway 27.  This ends at the traffic light with Decker Street, where the road turns East, concurrent with Wisconsin Highway 56.  This concurrency ends approximately  East of Viroqua.  Highway 82 turns left, to proceed to La Farge, while Highway 56 continues to Viola.

Major intersections

See also

References

External links

082
Transportation in Crawford County, Wisconsin
Transportation in Vernon County, Wisconsin
Transportation in Juneau County, Wisconsin
Transportation in Adams County, Wisconsin
Transportation in Marquette County, Wisconsin